Quality time  refers informally to periods proactively spent with one's loved ones.

Quality Time may refer to:
 Quality Time (album), a 1995 album by Whitehouse
 Quality Time (2017 film), a Dutch drama film
 My Apocalypse (film), originally titled Quality Time, a 2008 independent film